Eshaqabad (also Romanized as Esḩāqābād and Es’hāq Ābād) is a city in Eshaqabad Rural District, Zeberkhan County, Razavi Khorasan Province, Iran. At the 2006 census, its population was 3,810, in 988 families.

References 

Populated places in Nishapur County